Artas is a Palestinian village located four kilometers southwest of Bethlehem in the Bethlehem Governorate in the central West Bank. According to the Palestinian Central Bureau of Statistics, the town had a population of 3,663 in 2007.

Etymology
According to le Strange, the name Urtas is probably a corruption of Hortus, which has the same meaning as Firdus (Paradise), while E.H. Palmer thought it was a personal name. The name might also be derived from Latin hortus meaning garden, hence the name Hortus Conclusus of the nearby Catholic Convent.

Geography
It is bordered by Hindaza to the east, Ad Duheisha camp to the north, Al-Khader to the west, and Wadi Rahhal to the south. The Israeli settlement of Efrat is located nearby.
 Another exclusively Jewish Israeli Settlement neighborhood of Efrat, to be named Givat Eitam is planned to be built to surround Artas, across the hill, on top of the Christian monastery on the last piece of land that is available for the squished metropolitan area of Bethlehem to expand.

Artas and the surrounding area is characterized by the diversity of landscapes, flora and fauna due to its location at a meeting place of ecosystems. From a spring below the village an aqueduct used to carry water to Birket el Hummam by Jebel el Fureidis.

History

Fatimid to Mamluk eras
According to Moshe Sharon, professor of early Islamic history at Hebrew University, two inscriptions found in the village show the great interest in Artas from leaders in the Fatimid and Mamluk states, as well as the wealth of the village at that time.

Nasir Khusraw (1004-1088) wrote that "a couple of leagues from Jerusalem is a place where there are four villages, and there is here a spring of water, with numerous gardens and orchards, and it is called Faradis (or the Paradises), on account of the beauty of the spot."

During the Crusader period, the village was known as Artasium, or Iardium Aschas. In 1227, Pope Gregory IX confirmed that the village had been given to the Church of Bethlehem. Remains of the Crusader church were torn down in the 19th century.

Ottoman era

The village was incorporated into the Ottoman Empire in 1517 with all of Palestine, and in 1596 it appeared in the tax registers as being in the Nahiya of Quds of the Liwa of Quds. It had a population of 32 Muslim households. The villagers paid a fixed amount of 5,500 akçe in taxes, and all of the revenue went to a Muslim charitable endowment.

Until the 19th century, the Artas residents were responsible for guarding Solomon's Pools, a water system conducting water to Bethlehem, Herodium, and the Temple Mount or Haram al-Sharif in Jerusalem. The village had a tradition of hosting foreign and local scholars, not a few of whom were women. As a result, there is a great body of work on all aspects of the village.

In 1838, Robinson and Smith noted it as a Sunni Muslim village, located south of Wadi er-Rahib. The place was described as being inhabited, though with many houses in ruins. Robinson also found many signs of antiquity, including foundations of a square tower. He further noted the fine fountain above it, which watered many gardens.

In the mid-19th century, James Finn, the British Consul of Jerusalem (1846-1863), and his wife Elisabeth Ann Finn, bought land in Artas to establish an experimental farm where they planned to employ poverty-stricken Jews from the Old City of Jerusalem. Johann Adolf Großsteinbeck (1828–1913; grandfather of the author John Steinbeck) and his brother Friedrich, settled there under the leadership of John Meshullam, a converted Jew and member of a British missionary society. Clorinda S. Minor also lived in Artas in 1851 and 1853.

The French explorer Victor Guérin visited the area in July 1863, and he described the village to have about 300 inhabitants. Many of the village houses appeared to be built of ancient materials. An official Ottoman village list from about 1870 showed that Artas had 18 houses and a population of 60, though the population count included only men.

In 1883, the PEF's Survey of Western Palestine described Artas as "a small village perched against hill-side...with a good spring behind it whence an aqueduct led to Jebel Furedis...remains of a reservoir Humman Suleiman."

In 1896 the population of Artas was estimated to be about 120 persons.

British Mandate era

According to German explorer and orientalist Gustaf Dalman, in the early 20th-century, Artas supplied the Jerusalem marketplace with peaches, apricots and green pears. 

The Finnish anthropologist Hilma Granqvist came to Artas in the 1920s as part of her research on the women of the Old Testament. She "arrived in Palestine in order to find the Jewish ancestors of Scripture. What she found instead was a Palestinian people with a distinct culture and way of life. She therefore changed the focus of her research to a full investigation of the customs, habits and ways of thinking of the people of that village. Granqvist ended up staying till 1931 documenting all aspects of village life. In so doing she took hundreds of photographs." Her many books about Artas were published between 1931 and 1965, making Artas one of the best documented Palestinian villages.

In the 1922 census of Palestine, conducted by the British Mandate authorities, "Urtas" had a population of 433, 192 male and 197 female Muslims, and 1 male and 43 female Christians. In the 1931 census the population of Artas was a total of 619 in 123 inhabited houses. There were 272 male and 273 female Muslims, while there was 5 male and 69 female Christians.

In 1944, archaeologist Grace M.Crowfoot, while researching Palestinian weaving techniques, recorded two lullabies being sung in Artas:

In the 1945 statistics the population of Artas was 800; 690 Muslims and 110 Christians, who owned 4,304 dunams of land according to an official land and population survey. Of this, 894 dunams were plantations and irrigable land, 644 for cereals, while 54 dunams were built-up (urban) land.

Jordanian era
In the wake of the 1948 Arab–Israeli War, and after the 1949 Armistice Agreements, Artas came under Jordanian rule. It was annexed by Jordan in 1950.

In 1961, the population of Artas was 1,016, of whom 68 were Christian, the rest Muslim.

Post-1967
Since the Six-Day War in 1967, the town has been under Israeli occupation. The population in the 1967 census conducted by the Israeli authorities was 1,097.

After the 1995 accords, 66.7% of Artas land was classified as Area C, 0.06% as Area B, the remaining 33.3% as Area A. According to ARIJ, Israel has confiscated about 421 dunams of Artas land for the Israeli settlement of Efrat.

Religious institutions
Across the valley from the village is the Christian Convent of the Hortus Conclusus (lit. "Enclosed Garden", a name relating to both the Song of Songs and the Virgin Mary).

Cultural institutions
The Artas Folklore Center (AFC) was established in 1993 by Mr. Musa Sanad to document, preserve and share the rich heritage of the village. The village has a small folklore museum, a dabka and a drama troupe. The Artas Lettuce Festival has been an annual event since 1994. Artas is a popular destination for visitors to Bethlehem who want to experience traditional Palestinian life, and for groups interested in ecotourism.

Citations

General references

 

 (pp. 66  96)
 
 

  
Granqvist, H, 1931: Marriage conditions in a Palestinian village I. Helsingfors: Societas Scientiarum Fennica
Granqvist, H, 1935: Marriage conditions in a Palestinian village II. Helsingfors: Societas Scientiarum Fennica
 

 

 .
  
 

 
 
 

 (pp.  952- 955)

External links
 Welcome To Artas
 Artas, Welcome to Palestine
 Survey of Western Palestine, Map 17:  IAA, Wikimedia commons
 Artas Village (Fact Sheet), Applied Research Institute–Jerusalem (ARIJ)
 Artas Village Profile, (ARIJ)
 Artas aerial photo, (ARIJ)
 The priorities and needs for development in Artas village based on the community and local authorities’ assessment
 Artas Folklore Center
 Satellite View of Artas
 Sacrilege in the Bethlehem District Villages of Artas and El Walajeh 2 September 1999, POICA
 Report about violated and confiscated lands in Artas village 10 February 2003 POICA
 The Palestinian Village Artas Falls in the Vortex of the Segregation Wall 21 July 2004, POICA
 The Segregation Wall threatens the lands of Artas Village, Southwest Bethlehem City 17 May 2006, POICA
 Dabke Artas Lettuce Festival 2007 Part One, YouTube
 Dabke Artas Lettuce Festival 2007 Part Two, YouTube

Bethlehem Governorate
Municipalities of the State of Palestine
Villages in the West Bank